Francisco García Hernández (born 8 July 1954 in Madrid) is a Spanish retired footballer who played as a midfielder.

Playing career
After finishing his football formation at the club, García Hernández played five full seasons in La Liga with Real Madrid. During his spell, which began in 1978–79, he played in 22 games or more in three campaigns, being only a fringe player in the remaining two.

Having appeared in 129 official matches with the Merengues and won four major titles, Hernández signed in the 1983 summer with CD Castellón in Segunda División, playing there until his retirement six years later, with the exception of 1988–89 which he spent with fellow league side UD Alzira.

Manager career
From 1992 to 2000, García Hernández worked as a coach, incidentally with his two main clubs. His work in the professional level consisted of 17 games in the second division, six with Castellón in the 1991–92 season and 11 with Real Madrid Castilla in 1993–94.

In the latter campaign, he replaced young Rafael Benítez after he was fired, leading the reserve team to the sixth position.

Honours
Real Madrid
La Liga: 1978–79, 1979–80
Copa del Rey: 1979–80, 1981–82

Castellón
Copa de la Liga (Second Division): 1983–84

External links

1954 births
Living people
Footballers from Madrid
Spanish footballers
Association football midfielders
La Liga players
Segunda División players
Tercera División players
Real Madrid Castilla footballers
Real Madrid CF players
CD Guadalajara (Spain) footballers
CD Castellón footballers
UD Alzira footballers
Spain B international footballers
Spanish football managers
Segunda División managers
CD Castellón managers
Real Madrid Castilla managers